Transcription factor MafB also known as V-maf musculoaponeurotic fibrosarcoma oncogene homolog B is a protein that in humans is encoded by the MAFB gene. This gene maps to chromosome 20q11.2-q13.1, consists of a single exon and spans around 3 kb.

Function 

MafB is a basic leucine zipper (bZIP) transcription factor that plays an important role in the regulation of lineage-specific hematopoiesis. The encoded nuclear protein represses ETS1-mediated transcription of erythroid-specific genes in myeloid cells.

Clinical significance 

Mutations in the murine Mafb gene are responsible for the mutant mouse Kreisler (kr) that presents an abnormal segmentation of the hindbrain and exhibit hyperactive behavior, including head tossing and running in circles. This mice dies at birth due to renal failure whereas the Mafb -/- mice dies of central apnea.

Recently, single-nucleotide polymorphisms (SNPs) near MAFB have been found associated with  nonsyndromic cleft lip and palate.  The GENEVA Cleft Consortium study,  a genomewide association study involving 1,908 case-parent trios from Europe, the United States, China, Taiwan, Singapore, Korea, and the Philippines, first identified MAFB as being associated with cleft lip and/or palate with stronger genome-wide significance in Asian than European populations. The difference in populations could reflect variable coverage by available markers or true allelic heterogeneity.  In mouse models, Mafb mRNA and protein were detected in both craniofacial ectoderm and neural crest-derived mesoderm between embryonic days 13.5 and 14.5; expression was strong in the epithelium around the palatal shelves and in the medial edge epithelium during palatal fusion. After fusion, Mafb expression was stronger in oral epithelium compared to mesenchymal tissue. In addition, sequencing analysis detected a new missense mutation in the Filipino population, H131Q, that was significantly more frequent in cases than in matched controls. The gene-poor regions either side of the MAFB gene include numerous binding sites for transcription factors that are known to have a role in palate development.

References

Further reading

External links 
 
 
 

Transcription factors